Bitthadchir (Nepali: बित्थडचिर ) is a Gaupalika(Nepali: गाउपालिका ; gaupalika) in Bajhang District in the Sudurpashchim Province of far-western Nepal. 
Bitthadchir has a population of 17154.The land area is 86.15 km2.

References

Rural municipalities in Bajhang District
Rural municipalities of Nepal established in 2017